Anton Drasche (1 July 1826 – 23 August 1904) was an Austrian internist and epidemiologist.

Biography
Drasche studied medicine in Prague, Vienna and Leipzig, earning his doctorate in 1853. In Vienna, his instructors included Johann Ritter von Oppolzer, Carl von Rokitansky and Joseph Škoda. On a recommendation from German hygienist Max Pettenkofer, he became an associate professor of epidemiology in 1874.

He is remembered for his studies of epidemic diseases, such as typhoid, bubonic plague, influenza and especially Asiatic cholera. During the cholera epidemic in Vienna (1855), he distinguished himself when taking charge of the cholera section at Allgemeines Krankenhaus. He was also concerned with cardiac and pulmonary diseases, and was at the forefront in the promotion of hygienic measures.

Selected works

References

External link

1826 births
1904 deaths
Academic staff of the University of Vienna
Austrian internists
Austrian public health doctors
People from Děčín District